The North Branch Pawtuxet River is a river in the U.S. state of Rhode Island. There are 9 dams along the river's length.

Course
The river is formed by the confluence of the Ponaganset and Moswansicut rivers in the area that is now flooded by the Scituate Reservoir, the primary drinking water supply for the city of Providence as well as other cities and towns in the metro area. From the reservoir, it flows southeast through the historic textile mill villages of Hope, Arkright, Harris, Phenix, Lippitt and then into River Point, West Warwick where it converges with the South Branch Pawtuxet River to form the main branch of the Pawtuxet River.

Crossings
Below is a list of all crossings over the North Branch Pawtuxet River. The list starts at the headwaters and goes downstream.
Scituate
Scituate Avenue (RI 12) (Historic R.I. Bridge)
Main Street (RI 116)
Colvin Street
West Warwick
Lincoln Avenue
Fairview Avenue
Main Street (RI 115)

Tributaries
In addition to many unnamed tributaries, the following brooks also feed the North Branch Pawtuxet:
Burlingame Brook
Clarke Brook
Lippitt Brook

See also
List of rivers in Rhode Island
Moswansicut River
Pawtuxet River
Ponaganset River
South Branch Pawtuxet River
Scituate Reservoir

References
Maps from the United States Geological Survey

Rivers of Providence County, Rhode Island
Rivers of Kent County, Rhode Island
Rivers of Rhode Island
Tributaries of Providence River